The Treaty establishing the European Defence Community, also known as the Treaty of Paris, is an unratified treaty signed on 27 May 1952 by the six 'inner' countries of European integration: the Benelux countries, France, Italy, and West Germany. The treaty would have created a European Defence Community (EDC) with a pan-European defence force. The treaty failed to obtain ratification in the French Parliament and it was never ratified by Italy, so it consequently never entered into force. Instead, the London and Paris Conferences provided for West Germany's accession to NATO and the Western European Union (WEU), the latter of which was a transformed version of the pre-existing Western Union.

The treaty was initiated by the Pleven plan, proposed in 1950 by then French Prime Minister René Pleven in response to the American call for the rearmament of West Germany. The formation of a pan-European defence architecture, as an alternative to West Germany's proposed accession to NATO, was meant to harness the German military potential in case of conflict with the Soviet bloc. Just as the Schuman Plan was designed to end the risk of Germany having the economic power on its own to make war again, the Pleven Plan and EDC were meant to prevent the military possibility of Germany's making war again.

Planned organisation

The European Defence Community would have entailed a pan-European military, divided into national components, and had a common budget, common arms, centralized military procurement, and institutions.

Diagram showing the functioning of the institutions provided for by the Treaty establishing the European Defence Community (EDC), the placing of the European Defence Forces at the disposal of the Community, and the link between the EDC and the North Atlantic Treaty Organisation (NATO, with reference to this organisation's Supreme Allied Commander Europe and Council):

The main contributions to the proposed 43-division force:
France: 14 divisions, 750 planes
Germany: 12 divisions*
Italy: 12 divisions, 450 planes
Benelux: 5 divisions, 600 planes

*Germany would have had an air force, but a clause in the EDC treaty would have forbidden it to build war-planes, atomic weapons, guided missiles and battleships.

Reporting
In this military, the French, Italian, Belgian, Dutch, and Luxembourgish components would report to their national governments, whereas the West German component would report to the EDC. This was due to the fear of a return of German militarism, so it was desired that the West German government would not have control over the German military. However, in the event of its rejection, it was agreed to let the West German government control its own military in any case (something which the treaty would not have provided).

Defence arm of a European Political Community

A European Political Community (EPC) was proposed in 1952 as a combination of the existing European Coal and Steel Community (ECSC) and the proposed European Defence Community (EDC). A draft EPC treaty, as drawn up by the ECSC assembly (now the European Parliament), would have seen a directly elected assembly ("the Peoples’ Chamber"), a senate appointed by national parliaments and a supranational executive accountable to the parliament.

The European Political Community project failed in 1954 when it became clear that the European Defence Community would not be ratified by the French national assembly, which feared that the project entailed an unacceptable loss of national sovereignty. As a result, the European Political Community idea had to be abandoned.

Following the collapse of the EPC, European leaders met in the Messina Conference in 1955 and established the Spaak Committee which would pave the way for the creation of the European Economic Community (EEC).

History

Background
During the late 1940s, the divisions created by the Cold War were becoming evident. The United States looked with suspicion at the growing power of the USSR and European states felt vulnerable, fearing a possible Soviet occupation. In this climate of mistrust and suspicion, the United States considered the rearmament of West Germany as a possible solution to enhance the security of Europe and of the whole Western bloc.

In August 1950, Winston Churchill proposed the creation of a common European army, including German soldiers, in front of the Council of Europe:

The Parliamentary Assembly of the Council of Europe subsequently adopted the resolution put forward by the United Kingdom and officially endorsed the idea:

In September 1950, Dean Acheson, under a cable submitted by High Commissioner John J. McCloy, proposed a new plan to the European states; the American plan, called package, sought to enhance NATO's defense structure, creating 12 West German divisions. However, after the destruction that Germany had caused during World War II, European countries, in particular France, were not ready to see the reconstruction of the German military. Finding themselves in the midst of the two superpowers, they looked at this situation as a possibility to enhance the process of integrating Europe, trying to obviate the loss of military influence caused by the new bipolar order and thus supported a common army.

Launch of the Pleven Plan

On 24 October 1950, France's Prime Minister René Pleven proposed a new plan, which took his name although it was drafted mainly by Jean Monnet, that aimed to create a supranational European army. With this project, France tried to satisfy America's demands, avoiding, at the same time, the creation of German divisions, and thus the rearmament of Germany.

The EDC was to include West Germany, France, Italy, and the Benelux countries.  The United States would be excluded.  It was a competitor to NATO (in which the US played the dominant role), with France playing the dominant role. Just as the Schuman Plan was designed to end the risk of Germany having the economic power to make war again, the Pleven Plan and EDC were meant to prevent the same possibility. Britain approved of the plan in principle, but agreed to join only if the supranational element was decreased.

According to the Pleven Plan, the European Army was supposed to be composed of military units from the member states, and directed by a council of the member states’ ministers. Although with some doubts and hesitation, the United States and the six members of the ECSC approved the Pleven Plan in principle.

Negotiations
The initial approval of the Pleven Plan led the way to the Paris Conference, launched in February 1951, where it was negotiated the structure of the supranational army.

France feared the loss of national sovereignty in security and defense, and thus a truly supranational European Army could not be tolerated by Paris. However, because of the strong American interest in a West German army, a draft agreement for a modified Pleven Plan, renamed the European Defense Community (EDC), was ready in May 1952, with French support.

Signing
Among compromises and differences, on 27 May 1952 the six foreign ministers signed the Treaty of Paris establishing the European Defence Community (EDC).

Ratification
All signatories except France and Italy ratified the treaty. The Italian parliament aborted its ratification process due to France's failed ratification.

French rejection
The EDC went for ratification in the French National Assembly on 30 August 1954, and failed by a vote of 319 against 264.

By the time of the vote, concerns about a future conflict faded with the death of Joseph Stalin and the end of the Korean War. Concomitant to these fears were a severe disjuncture between the original Pleven Plan of 1950 and the one defeated in 1954. Divergences included military integration at the division rather than battalion level and a change in the command structure putting NATO's Supreme Allied Commander Europe (SACEUR) in charge of EDC operational capabilities. The reasons that led to the failed ratification of the Treaty were twofold, concerning major changes in the international scene, as well as domestic problems of the French Fourth Republic. There were Gaullist fears that the EDC threatened France's national sovereignty, constitutional concerns about the indivisibility of the French Republic, and fears about West Germany's remilitarization. French Communists opposed a plan tying France to the capitalist United States and setting it in opposition to the Communist bloc. Other legislators worried about the absence of the United Kingdom.

The Prime Minister, Pierre Mendès-France, tried to placate the treaty's detractors by attempting to ratify additional protocols with the other signatory states. These included the sole integration of covering forces, or in other words, those deployed within West Germany, as well as the implementation of greater national autonomy in regard to  budgetary and other administrative questions. Despite the central role for France, the EDC plan collapsed when it failed to obtain ratification in the French Parliament.

Aftermath
The treaty never went into effect. Instead, after the failed ratification in the French National Assembly, West Germany was admitted into NATO and the EEC member states tried to create foreign policy cooperation in the De Gaulle-sponsored Fouchet Plan (1959–1962). European foreign policy was finally established during the third attempt with European Political Cooperation (EPC) (1970). This became the predecessor of the Common Foreign and Security Policy (CFSP).

Today the European Union and NATO, and formerly also the Western European Union, all carry out some of the functions which was envisaged for the EDC, although none approach the degree of supranational military control that the EDC would have provided for.

See also

 History of the European Union
 Western Union
 Western European Union
 European Political Community (1952)
 Common Foreign and Security Policy (1993–present)
 European Security and Defence Identity (ESDI)
 European Security and Defence Policy (1999–present)
 Treaty of Brussels
 European Defence Agency

References

Further reading
 Fursdon, Edward. The European Defence Community: A History  (1980), the standard history online
 
 Ruane, Kevin. The Rise and Fall of the European Defence Community: Anglo-American Relations and the Crisis of European Defense, 1950–55 Palgrave, 2000. 252 pp.
 Guillen, Pierre. "France and the Defence of Western Europe: From the Brussels Pact (March 1948) to the Pleven Plan (October 1950)." in The Western Security Community: Common Problems and Conflicting Interests during the Foundation Phase of the North Atlantic Alliance, ed. Norbert Wigershaus and Roland G. Foerster (Oxford UP, 1993), pp 125–48.

External links
 EDC Treaty (unofficial translation) see pg 2
 EDC information on European Navigation
 EUROPEAN ARMY: De Gaulle's Alternative  
 Archival material concerning the EDC can be consulted at the Historical Archives of the European Union in Florence.

Military history of the European Union
Unratified treaties of the European Union
1950 in the European Economic Community
1952 in the European Economic Community
20th-century military alliances
Anti-communism
Cold War treaties
International military organizations
Military alliances involving France
Military alliances involving Luxembourg
Military alliances involving Belgium
Military alliances involving the Netherlands
Military alliances involving Italy
Cold War military history of Belgium
Contemporary French history
1950 in France
1950 in international relations